Daniel Gross is an American entrepreneur who co-founded Cue (search engine) and later founded the startup accelerator Pioneer. Gross was born in Jerusalem, Israel in 1991. In 2013, Cue was sold to Apple where Gross led machine learning efforts until joining Y Combinator as a partner in January 2017. Gross is also a technology angel investor and contributor to the technology news site TechCrunch.

Career

In 2010, Gross was accepted in to the Y Combinator program. At the time, he was the youngest founder ever accepted. Gross launched Greplin (later renamed Cue).

In 2011 Forbes named Gross one of "30 Under 30" in the "Pioneers in Technology" category. In 2012, Business Insider named Gross one of the "25 under 25" in Silicon Valley, and in 2014, the site named him one of "30 under 30 Influential Young People in Tech".

Cue 

In 2010, Gross launched Greplin, a search engine designed to allow the users to search online accounts (such as social media, email, and cloud storage) from one location without having to check each individually. In 2011, Greplin raised $4 million in funding from venture capital firm Sequoia Capital. At 19, Gross was one of Sequoia's youngest founders.

In 2012 the company renamed itself to "Cue" and launched an additional predictive search features. In 2013, Apple acquired Cue for an undisclosed amount reported to be between $40 million and $60 million.

Y Combinator 
In 2017, Gross joined Y Combinator as a partner, where he focused on Artificial Intelligence.

Pioneer 
In August 2018, Gross created Pioneer, an early-stage, remote startup accelerator and fund, focused on finding talented and ambitious people around the world.

References

1991 births
Businesspeople in information technology
Living people
Place of birth missing (living people)
21st-century American businesspeople